Park Sang-hyun (born October 7, 1990), known by his stage name Thunder, is a South Korean singer, songwriter, actor and model. He is a former member of South Korean boy band MBLAQ. On December 16, 2014, it was announced that he had departed from the group to focus on studying music. He signed with Mystic Entertainment's music label APOP on February 11, 2015 and released his debut extended play on December 7, 2016.

Life and career

1990–2008: Early life and career beginnings
Park Sang-hyun was born in Busan, South Korea, but grew up in the Philippines. He has two elder sisters, Sandara and Durami. Aside from his native Korean, he is also fluent in English and Tagalog, and can speak conversational Mandarin and Japanese.

His eldest sister, Sandara, achieved nationwide fame in the Philippines in 2004 after becoming the runner-up on the first season of Star Circle Quest, a talent search reality competition. He first appeared on national television when he attended the finale with his mother. Later on, as his sister began her hectic activities as a celebrity, a crew from one of South Korea's biggest television agencies recorded her daily life in the documentary My Name Is Sandara Park. This marked Thunder's first ever appearance on South Korean television.

Sandara's eventual decision to pursue activities in their home country led to their family's return to South Korea in 2007. By this time, Thunder had finished secondary education in the Philippines. It was later on revealed in a magazine interview that he had originally decided to pursue a professional career as a soccer player, specifically as a midfielder. He gave up and instead started auditioning for entertainment agencies, one of which was JYP Entertainment. He had taken dancing workshops offered by Sandara's home network back in the Philippines.

Thunder eventually became a trainee under LOEN Entertainment, where he met IU. He appeared in IU's debut music video for her song "Lost Child" and was also seen in a couple of videos with her wherein they sing Big Bang's "Lies" and Super Junior's "Sorry Sorry."

2009–2014: MBLAQ

Thunder, Seung-ho, G.O, Lee Joon and Mir made their debut as MBLAQ on October 9, 2009 at Rain's Legend of Rainism concert where they performed various songs from their then-unreleased single album Just BLAQ. On October 14, MBLAQ officially released their debut single album Just BLAQ, along with the "Oh Yeah" music video. A day later, MBLAQ had their debut stage with their title song "Oh Yeah" on Mnet's M! Countdown. Also in October, he was featured in Lyn's "New Celebration" music video. In November, he starred in a commercial film with Wonder Girls for Cafe Mori.

Because of his androgynous face and modelesque image he was featured in Elle Girl's February 2010 issue. He was given a 4-page spread, where he showed off his unique yet fashionista chic image. In March 2010, Thunder alongside U-KISS' Dongho and Eli and Shinee's Key hosted a new variety show called Raising Idol. In March 2010, he also appears in K.Will's "Gift" music video. Thunder also participated in Mnet's Mnet Scandal. He was also a host of The M-Wave, a music program which aired on Arirang TV with Krystal Jung. Having lived in the Philippines, he participated in the cable TV show, Mom, I've gone crazy for English with Nicole Jung, where he was an English mentor to young children. In 2010, Thunder was also chosen to become Alba Heaven spokesperson. It is a job search site, focusing on connecting users who want part-time jobs with potential businesses and employers, he participated in a TV CF which was broadcast on the airwaves.

In 2011, Thunder was made a permanent cast member of the KBS show Imagination Arcade. He was featured in a six-page spread on the October issue of Singles, showing a completely different image. In December 2011, Thunder had a cameo role in jTBC drama Padam Padam where he played the role of Yang Kang-woo, the older brother of Yang Kang-chil (played by Jung Woo-sung).

In 2012, he was featured in two magazines: he posed shirtless for the March issue of Harper's Bazaar and the April issue of L'Officiel Hommes Korea; both were an eight-page spread. Also in April, Wanna Girls magazine named him as new fashionista icon of 2012, along with Jessica Jung, Hyomin and Yong Jun-hyung. In July 2012, Thunder released a self-composed solo song titled "Don't Go" for "The BLAQ% Tour" album. In October, Thunder started his career in runway as he walked for Lee Jae-ho's Coexistence Collection in S/S 2013 Seoul Fashion Week. In November, he walked for Korean designer Park Jong-cheol's fashion show 'Bling Bling Party' as part of SUNY Korea Festival.

In January 2013, Thunder was cast as the male lead in the MBC drama Nail Shop Paris, with Park Gyu-ri. In 2014, he was cast in the dance musical Moon Night, along with Seung-ho and Two X's Jiyou. In 2014, Thunder released his first single "Gone" which he composed himself. In March 2014, Thunder had graced the runway again for designer Lie Sang Bong's fashion show in 2014 F/W Seoul Fashion Week. He released his second single "Monster" later that year. On December 16, 2014, Thunder and Lee Joon officially withdrew from the group after their contracts expired.

2015–present: Return to acting and Thunder
In 2015, he was cast in the role of Kang Hyun-seo in the MBC drama Make a Woman Cry. Starting with this drama, he is being credited by his birth name (except for music-related projects). In 2016, he made a cameo appearance on another MBC drama, Woman with a Suitcase, as Cheondung, a lawyer interviewing for the same job as Ma Seok-woo (played by Lee Joon).

On November 23, 2016, Mystic Entertainment revealed that Thunder would release new music in December. His self-titled debut extended play as a solo artist was released on December 7, 2016 and featured guest appearances by Goo Hara, Basick and Giantpink. Thunder participated in writing and composing all five tracks. The music video for the promotional single "Sign" features his sister Sandara.
On February 6, 2017, it was announced that Thunder would be the first Korean idol to star in a Korean-Indonesian movie, titled Forever-Holidays in Bali. On April 19, before going over to Bali to film the movie, Thunder appeared in Indonesian music show "Dahsyat" to perform. It was a huge success with the hashtag #ThunderOnDahsyat trending second on Indonesian Twitter that morning.

Discography

Extended plays

Singles

As featured artist

Filmography

Film

Television drama

Television shows

Television show hosting

Stage

References

External links

 

1990 births
J. Tune Entertainment artists
Living people
Mystic Entertainment artists
South Korean expatriates in the Philippines
K-pop singers
South Korean male idols
South Korean dance musicians
South Korean rhythm and blues singers
South Korean pop singers
South Korean male singers
South Korean male television actors
Male actors from Busan
Musicians from Busan
MBLAQ members